Edda Soligo (1905–1984) was an Italian film and television actress.

Selected filmography
 Adam's Tree (1936)
 The Man from Nowhere (1937)
 The Former Mattia Pascal (1937)
 Il signor Max (1937)
 To Live (1937)
 Tonight at Eleven (1938)
 A Romantic Adventure (1940)
 Lucky Night (1941)
 The Secret Lover (1941)
 The King's Jester (1941)
 Torrents of Spring (1942)
 The Two Orphans (1942)
 Lively Teresa (1943)
 Peddlin' in Society (1946)
 Night Taxi (1950)
 La figlia del diavolo (1952)
 Naples Sings (1953)
 Storms (1953)
 Frine, Courtesan of Orient (1953)
 The Most Wonderful Moment (1957)
 The Law (1959)
 Girl with a Suitcase (1961)

References

Bibliography
 Verdone, Luca. I film di Alessandro Blasetti. Gremese Editore, 1989.

External links

1905 births
1984 deaths
Italian film actresses
Italian television actresses
Actors from Florence